Doroteo Jose station is an elevated Manila Light Rail Transit (LRT) station situated on Line 1. The station is located in Santa Cruz in Manila, on Rizal Avenue and slightly past Doroteo Jose Street. Both the station and the street are named after Doroteo Jose, a Filipino who was arrested by Spanish authorities in 1898 for leading a movement against a corrupt archbishop.

Doroteo Jose station is the second station of Line 1 north of the Pasig River, after Carriedo station.  It is the tenth station for trains headed to Baclaran and the eleventh station for trains headed to Roosevelt.

The station is near the Manila City Jail and the Fabella Memorial Hospital. Popular shopping centers such as the Isetann Cinerama Recto and the Quiapo Bargain Center are also nearby. Due to its position of being near the University Belt, the station is also close to educational institutions of the University Belt. It is one of the only stations on the line where commuters can transfer from one platform to another without having to go down to the street level, however unlike Central Terminal, Roosevelt, Carriedo, and Balintawak stations, commuters still have to exit the fare gates to access the walkway above the platforms.

The station's renovation program began in December 2016. The renovation improved and equipped the station with structural upgrades and new modern facilities. It was reopened in a ceremony on February 6, 2017.

Transportation links
Doroteo Jose station serves as the transfer point between Lines 1 and 2. The station is connected to Recto station by means of an elevated walkway.

The station, being near the University Belt of Manila, serves as an important transfer point for buses, taxis, and cycle rickshaws, although this role is also being given to the closer Recto station. Buses stop at the bus terminal on Recto Avenue.

Many provincial bus lines, such as Bataan Transit (Bataan, Pampanga, Pangasinan, and other Northern Luzon provinces), Genesis Transport Service Inc. (Bataan, Pampanga, and Baguio), Solid North Transit Inc. (Pangasinan and Tarlac), and Philippine Rabbit (Tarlac and Baguio) provide bus terminals near the station and serve the northern corridors.

Gallery

See also
List of rail transit stations in Metro Manila
Manila Light Rail Transit System

References

Manila Light Rail Transit System stations
Railway stations opened in 1985
Buildings and structures in Santa Cruz, Manila
1985 establishments in the Philippines